The Como Watershed is a small, but biologically important, watershed in Coquitlam, British Columbia, Canada. Its headwater is Como Lake. There are four main tributaries which lead to the Fraser River, which in turn flows to the Pacific Ocean: Popeye Creek, Booth Creek, Macdonald Creek, and Mill Creek. The total size of the watershed is about 8.7 km2.

External links
 Como Watershed Group

Landforms of Coquitlam
Watersheds of Canada